The women's javelin throw at the 2022 European Athletics Championships will take place at the Olympiastadion on 18 and 20 August.

Records

Schedule

Results

Qualification

Qualification: 61.00 m (Q) or best 12 performers (q)

Final

References

Javelin Throw
Javelin throw at the European Athletics Championships
Euro